José Renato Rabelo (born 22 February 1942 in Ubaíra, Bahia) is a Brazilian politician and physician. He was the national president of the Communist Party of Brazil from 2001 to 2015. In 1965 he was the president of the Union of Students of Bahia, but his management was interrupted by the military regime, forcing him to live in clandestinity.

References 

Brazilian communists
Communist Party of Brazil politicians
1942 births
People from Bahia
20th-century Brazilian physicians
Living people